is a Japanese food manufacturer. Its main products and services include soy sauce, food seasoning and flavoring, mirin, and sake, juice and other beverages, pharmaceuticals, and restaurant management services.

Kikkoman has production plants and offices in Japan, the U.S., the Netherlands, Singapore, Taiwan, China and Canada. Kikkoman is the most popular brand of soy sauce in Japan and the United States. The village of Sappemeer in Groningen, the Netherlands, is the European headquarters of the company. A plant on the site began operations in 1997 and now produces over 400 million litres of soy sauce per annum.

History

West Japanese-style soy sauce, called , has been a well-known condiment for over 300 years. Kikkoman is the largest  manufacturing company in the world, and "the one most responsible for introducing  to the West".

Founded contemporarily in 1917, with the merger of eight family-owned companies, Kikkoman is based in Noda, Chiba Prefecture, Japan.  Those companies were founded as early as 1603 by the Mogi and Takanashi families. Kikkoman was originally known as the "Noda Shoyu Corporation" before 1940, when they adopted a single nationwide brand name.

Products

Soy sauce
Kikkoman soy sauce is naturally brewed. After soaking in water for an extended period, soybeans are steamed at high temperature before they are mixed with crushed roasted wheat. Salt is added, which acts as an anti-bacterial agent and preservative. Next, a genus of the Aspergillus fungus is added to the mixture and left for three days to create , the base for the soy sauce. Several months of aging follow, when various organic processes occur including lactic acid, alcoholic and organic acid fermentation take place to create unique flavours. The  is then mechanically pressed through layers of fabric for around ten hours to extract the raw product.

In the last part of the process, the raw soy sauce is left to separate for 3–4 days, then pasteurised using steam, which also stops any enzymic activity. The final product is then ready for inspection and bottling. Kikkoman has a distinctive bottle for its soy sauce, designed by Kenji Ekuan in 1961.

Gallery

See also

 Kikkoman Soy Sauce Museum

References

External links

 The World of Kikkoman

Japanese companies established in 1917
Companies based in Chiba Prefecture
Food and drink companies established in 1917
Companies listed on the Tokyo Stock Exchange
Condiment companies
Food and drink companies of Japan
Japanese brands
Japanese Imperial Warrant holders
Soy product brands
Zaibatsu